is a passenger railway station located in the city of Sōka, Saitama, Japan, operated by the private railway operator Tōbu Railway.

Lines
Shingen Station is served by the Tōbu Skytree Line, and is 20.5 kilometers from the Tokyo terminus of the line at Asakusa Station.

Station layout
The station has one elevated island platform with two tracks. The station building is located underneath the platforms. There are two additional tracks for non-stop trains to bypass this station.

Platforms

Adjacent stations

History
The station opened on 20 December 1899. The station was closed on 2 December 1908 and reopened on 10 November 1925. It was rebuilt as an elevated station in March 1992.

From 17 March 2012, station numbering was introduced on all Tōbu lines, with Shinden Station becoming "TS-18".

Passenger statistics
In fiscal 2019, the station was used by an average of 31,295 passengers daily.

Surrounding area
 Sōka Asahimachi Danchi New Town
 Gamo Post Office
 Sōka Park

See also
 List of railway stations in Japan

References

External links

  

Railway stations in Japan opened in 1899
Tobu Skytree Line
Stations of Tobu Railway
Railway stations in Saitama Prefecture
Sōka